Peter Benson (born 1956) is the author of novels, plays, short stories and poetry, and has been described by the London Evening Standard as having "one of the most distinctive voices in modern British fiction".

Career
He has won a number of prizes for his work, including The Guardian Fiction Prize, The Encore Award and The Somerset Maugham Award, and was awarded a Society of Authors Travelling Scholarship in 1994.

Personal life
Benson is father to a daughter, Ella (born 1995), by poet Carol Ann Duffy who was in a relationship with novelist and poet Jackie Kay.

Bibliography

Novels
 1987, The Levels (Constable, Penguin)
 1989, A Lesser Dependency (Macmillan, Penguin)
 1990, The Other Occupant (Macmillan, Penguin)
 1993, Odo's Hanging (Hodder & Stoughton)
 1994, Riptide (Hodder & Stoughton)
 1995, A Private Moon (Hodder & Stoughton)
 1997, The Shape of Clouds (Hodder & Stoughton)
 2011, Two Cows and a Vanful of Smoke (Alma Books)
 2012, Isabel's Skin (Alma Books)
 2017, The South in Winter (Alma Books)
 2020, The Stromness Dinner  (Seren)
 2022, Kidnap Fury of the Smoking Lovers (Seren)

Plays
 2013, The Two Friends with Alessandro Gallenzi (Calder Publications)

Short stories
 1987, Jude: Winter's Tales 3 (Constable)
 1988, Alan: Winter's Tales 4 (Constable)
 1988, Rajastan, 1987: 20 Under 35 (Picador)
 1990, Gates of Swimming: Winter's Tales 6 (Constable)
 2000, Dominion: New Writing 9 (Vintage)

Awards

 The Levels - Winner, The Guardian Fiction Prize
 The Levels - Winner, The Author's Club First Novel Award
 The Levels - Winner, The Betty Trask Prize
 The Levels - Shortlisted, The Whitbread Book Award
 The Levels - Shortlisted, The Premio Letterario Chianti
 A Lesser Dependency - Winner, The Encore Award
 The Other Occupant - Winner, The Somerset Maugham Award
 Society of Authors - Awarded, Travelling Scholarship 1994 
 Two Cows and a Vanful of Smoke - Selected, Fiction Uncovered 2012

References

1956 births
English male novelists
20th-century English novelists
21st-century English novelists
20th-century English male writers
21st-century English male writers
Living people